Bartzen is a surname. Notable people with the surname include: 

Bernard Bartzen (1927–2019), American tennis player
Peter Bartzen (1857–1934), American businessman and politician

See also
Barten (surname)